Virginia Open Education Foundation (VOEF) is a not-for-profit 501(c)(3) corporation dedicated to bringing curriculum and educational content resources to the K-12 students of the Commonwealth of Virginia through open education. It was started and is currently directed by Middlesex County Public Schools Technology Director Mark Burnet.

Stated mission

 The mission of this non-profit organization is to bring curriculum and educational content resources to the students of Virginia. The manner in which this is accomplished will be to assess, fund and deploy materials and content held in creative commons.
 Delivery and collaborative tools and methods would be provided to educational institutions within the Commonwealth. It is not intended that this would supplant or encroach on the mission of other educational organizations, but to foster an interoperable framework for resource users of a license-free learning environment.
 It is the philosophy of this organization to support a service business model using open source content, software and systems. This philosophy extends to support global adoption of the best practices of this model as it supports facets of education.
 Methods and systems proposed by this organization must be reviewed and adopted in a framework of the scientific method.

Virginia Open Textbook Project

VOEF aims to establish a Creative Commons database of educational resources produced by private and public funding and aligned to the Virginia Standards of Learning. These resources would then be used by individual school systems through print on demand technology for paper textbooks and would be accessible online through content management systems.

Burnet advocates that switching to open source content would greatly reduce textbook prices for Virginia and would allow up-to-date content to be generated and distributed quickly. Because the content would be in the creative commons, private schools would have full rights to use the content, and would be able to modify it for their purposes before use. Also, because content would be generated within the state, it could be based on Virginia's own learning standards instead of those from states like Texas and California, which are currently used to produce many of Virginia's textbooks. It is the view of the organization that educational resources and implementation would be greatly improved, giving children better access to content, including, eventually, online access. While the initiative is primarily focused on Virginia, all content would be free for use by anyone around the world.

Legislative efforts

In January 2007 VOEF worked with State Delegate Christopher Peace to propose to the House of the General Assembly Joint Resolution 702, which would form a joint subcommittee to consider open education implementation in the Commonwealth. This bill was eventually scrapped in favor of an Open Education Resources advisory committee within the Joint Commission on Technology and Science. This committee first met in Richmond on June 20, 2007. Members were interested in lowering costs, providing materials to a broader group of learners, and speeding the process of content distribution via electronic delivery and print on demand.

For the 2008 session, a full subcommittee was formed. An early priority was to unlock some of the production and procurement processes for school textbooks in both K-12 and higher education. To this end, VOEF submitted a proposal to Peace that culminated in work by the Virginia Department of Education to create Virginia House Bill 137, which redefined textbooks to include all electronic versions so as to remove restrictions to paper-bound volumes. The bill passed unanimously in every vote, and was signed by Governor Tim Kaine on March 7, 2008.

In conjunction with VOEF, Chris Peace introduced two more bills in January 2009. The first, HB1940, would authorize the establishment of open education resource centers. Such centers would be able to be either privately or publicly funded, but the legislation would expire if no funding is provided within two years. The second, HB1941, is a proposal that would encourage educational materials produced by the state to be released under a Creative Commons license.

See also
 Open educational resources
 Cape Town Open Education Declaration

Notes

External links
 official site
 Washington Post blog by Marc Fisher "Fighting the Textbook Cartel" about Christopher Peace's initiative
 JCOTS Committee on Open Educational Resources, Virginia General Assembly

Non-profit organizations based in Virginia
Open content projects
Educational organizations based in the United States
Open educational resources